Though I Know the River is Dry (Arabic: مع آني آعرف آن النهر قد جف) is a 2013 Palestinian short crowd-sourced film directed by Egyptian-British filmmaker and writer Omar Robert Hamilton.

Synopsis 
The film tells the story of a man's return to Palestine years after making a decision to emigrate to America. The story is told through parallel timelines, interweaved with archival footage.

Critical reception 
The film premiered in competition at International Film Festival Rotterdam where it won the Prix UIP and the festival's nomination for Best Short Film at the 2013 European Film Awards. The competition jury stated that "the film is remarkable in the way it connects contemporary political issues with emotional dilemmas. Its cinematographic language builds on the qualities of the photographic composition, the direction of the actors and the subtle and intelligent use of archival material. The result embodies a poetic and restrained approach to questions which unfortunately are becoming more and more commonplace. In a particularly undogmatic manner, it offers multiple readings, while simultaneously sharply addressing historical, political and economical realities.

It won Best Short from the Arab World at the Abu Dhabi Film Festival in November 2013. It has been widely well reviewed.

Cast 
Kais Nashef
Salwa Nakkara
Hussam Ghosheh
Maya Abu Alhayyat

Awards and nominations
2013 Winner: Prix UIP at the International Film Festival Rotterdam
2013 Winner: Best Short from the Arab World, Abu Dhabi Film Festival
2013 Nominee: Best Short Film, European Film Awards
2013 Nominee: Tiger Award for Short Film International Film Festival Rotterdam
2014 Official Selection: Clermont-Ferrand International Short Film Festival

See also
List of Palestinian films

References

External links

2013 films
Palestinian drama films